In enzymology, a pantetheine hydrolase is an enzyme that catalyzes the chemical reaction

(R)-pantetheine + H2O  (R)-pantothenate + 2-aminoethanethiol

Thus, the two substrates of this enzyme are (R)-pantetheine and H2O, whereas its two products are (R)-pantothenate and 2-aminoethanethiol.

This enzyme belongs to the family of hydrolases, those acting on carbon-nitrogen bonds other than peptide bonds, specifically in linear amides.  The systematic name of this enzyme class is (R)-pantetheine amidohydrolase. Other names in common use include pantetheinase, vanin, and vanin-1.  This enzyme participates in pantothenate and coa biosynthesis.

References

 
 
 
 
 
 
 

EC 3.5.1
Enzymes of unknown structure